Animalisms is the third studio album by British R&B/blues rock band the Animals, and was released in the United Kingdom in May 1966 on Decca Records. It was the first Animals album to be produced by Tom Wilson as well as the first to feature keyboardist Dave Rowberry after the May 1965 departure of original keyboardist Alan Price. It reached No. 4 on the UK Albums Chart and remained there for 17 weeks.

Track listing

Personnel 
The Animals
 Eric Burdon – lead vocals
 Hilton Valentine – guitar, vocals
 Dave Rowberry – keyboards, vocals
 Chas Chandler – bass, vocals
 John Steel – drums, except as noted below
 Barry Jenkins – drums on "Don't Bring Me Down", "Cheating" and "See See Rider"
Technical
 Tom Wilson – producer

Charts

References

External links
 Discography and Info on The Animals

1966 albums
The Animals albums
Decca Records albums
Albums produced by Tom Wilson (record producer)